Telephonat Beni Suef Sporting Club, sometimes referred to as TE Beni Suef, is an Egyptian sports club based in Beni Suef, Egypt. The club currently plays in the Egyptian Second Division, the second-highest league in the Egyptian football league system.

The club promoted to the Egyptian Premier League for the first time in its history in 2011, after winning the 2010–11 Egyptian Second Division.

Current squad

Managers
 Hamza El Gamal (Aug 21, 2011 – Jan 1, 2012)
 Ashraf Kasem (Jan 2, 2012 – May 13, 2012)
 Talaat Youssef (May 13, 2012 – July 23, 2013)

Egyptian Second Division
Football clubs in Egypt